Kevin "Rashid" Johnson (born October 3, 1971 in Richmond, Virginia) is a revolutionary, writer, artist, social activist, founding member of the New Afrikan Black Panther Party, founding member of the Revolutionary Intercommunal Black Panther Party (which split from the NABPP in December 2020), member of the Incarcerated Workers Organizing Committee, and prisoner in the Ohio Department of Rehabilitation and Correction. 

Johnson, a former drug dealer, was convicted of murder in 1990, and sentenced to life in prison. He maintains that he is innocent and was wrongfully convicted.

Imprisonment

According to his official biography, he has spent some 18 years in solitary confinement, during which he studied law and subsequently filed a number of lawsuits against the prison system.

In 2017, Johnson was transferred from the Texas Department of Criminal Justice to the Florida Department of Corrections for allegedly having a weapon in his cell, although he claims he was transferred as the result of "persistently publicizing the abuses of the Texas prison system".

Johnson was charged with inciting a riot on January 10, 2018, after helping to organize a prison strike centered in Florida, and after publishing a related article on the anarchist website It's Going Down. In the piece, entitled Florida Prisoners Are Laying It Down, Johnson detailed what he views as the "objectionable conditions" of prisoners, including unpaid labor, price gouging, and the "gain-time scam that replaced parole". Although the state of Florida maintains the strike never occurred, prison rights groups released statements claiming that "prisoners in more than a dozen facilities either went on strike or were preemptively punished to prevent them from doing so." Johnson's lawyers have alleged he was tortured in retaliation while held in solitary confinement, and was confined in an unheated cell in freezing temperatures.

In August 2021, a statement from the Revolutionary Intercommunal Black Panther Party noted that Johnson had been moved from Indiana to Ohio, where it was alleged that he had been threatened with lynching, and prevented from writing or communicating with supporters.

Writing and political views
Johnson is a frequent contributor to the newspaper San Francisco Bay View.

Johnson maintains that prison labor is a form of modern slavery, writing in The Guardian:

At the end of the civil war in 1865 the 13th amendment of the US constitution was introduced. Under its terms, slavery was not abolished, it was merely reformed. Anybody convicted of a crime after 1865 could be leased out by the state to private corporations who would extract their labor for little or no pay. In some ways that created worse conditions than under the days of slavery, as private corporations were under no obligation to care for their forced laborers – they provided no healthcare, nutritious food or clothing to the individuals they were exploiting.

Revolutionary Intercommunal Black Panther Party
In December 2020, Johnson and five others declared they were splitting from the New Afrikan Black Panther Party, alleging that the leadership outside the prison system had "purged all critics" including most non-incarcerated members. Johnson said he would be forming a new "Revolutionary Intercommunal" Black Panther Party which would pursue Huey P. Newton's ideology of Intercommunalism.

Publications

Books

Articles

See also

 George Jackson (activist)
 Prison abolition movement
 Prison reform

Notes

References

Further reading

External links

1971 births
Living people
African-American communists
American feminists
American Maoists
American people convicted of murder
American revolutionaries
Anti-revisionists
Minority rights activists
Prison abolitionists
Male feminists
American political party founders